The Army War Institute, formerly Army War Academy, is an academic institution of the National Defence University. It is sometimes referred to in English as the Turkish Military College.

Other Military Colleges
It must not be confused with Ottoman Military College, Turkish Military Academy (Kara Harp Okulu) and Armed Forces College (Silahlı Kuvvetler Akademisi), and National Security College (Milli Güvenlik Akademisi).

References

 
Military academies of Turkey